Korbol is a sub-prefecture of Moyen-Chari Region in Chad.

The Bua language is the local lingua franca of Korbol.

References 

Populated places in Chad